Lim Hyun-Jun (Hangul: 임현준, Hanja: 林玄埈; born December 21, 1988 in Daegu) is a South Korean relief pitcher who plays for the Samsung Lions of the KBO League. He bats and throws left-handed. Lim is currently the only left-handed sidearm pitcher in the league.

Amateur career
Lim played college baseball at Kyungsung University in Busan. As a freshman in  he earned MVP honors at the President's Flag Championship, tossing a complete game shutout victory in the final game. Lim finished his first collegiate season with a record of 8-1 and an ERA of 1.61 in 67 innings pitched.

In April , Lim was named to the preliminary 66-man South Korea national baseball team roster for the 2008 Beijing Olympic Games. He was one of the only six amateur players in the preliminary roster.

Lim fell into a slump due to injuries from 2008- season. However, Lim bounced back in  when he posted a record of 8-2 and an ERA of 2.58 in 104.2 innings pitched. Lim hurled 6 complete game (1 shutout) victories out of his 8 wins with 68 strikeouts, and helped his team to win the titles at the President's Flag Championship and the National Collegiate Championship, named MVP in both of the competitions.

Professional career
Lim was drafted with the 29th overall pick of the  KBO Draft by the Samsung Lions. As a rookie, he was selected for the Lions' Opening Day 26-man roster to replace Lions' top setup man Kwon Hyuk, who had been sidelined with injuries prior to the season. Lim made his pro league debut against the KIA Tigers on April 2, 2011 when Lim racked up his first win pitching 1/3 of a scoreless inning. In April, Lim posted a 1.17 ERA appearing in 13 games as a left-handed specialist. In May, however, Lim lost command of his pitches and the ERA dipped to over 3.00. In early June, Lim was finally demoted to the Lions' second-tier team as Kwon Hyuk came back from a disabled list.

Notable international careers

External links 
 Profile and stats from KBO (official website)

1988 births
Living people
Samsung Lions players
South Korean baseball players
KBO League pitchers
Kyungsung University alumni
Sportspeople from Daegu